The following outline is provided as an overview of and topical guide to business:

Business – organization of one or more individuals, engaged in the trade of goods, services, or both to consumers, and the activity of such organizations, also known as "doing business".

Types of businesses

By activity 
 See: Industry classification

By legal structure 

Types of business entity
 Sole proprietorship
 Partnership
 Corporation

Business activities 
 Accounting
 Commerce
 Finance
 Industrial and labour relations
 Management (outline)
 Manufacturing
 Marketing
Research and development

Concepts
 Advertising
 Banking
 Barter
 Big business
 Business acumen
 Business broker
 Business ethics
 Business hours
 Business intelligence
 Business mediator
 Business model design
 Business plan
 Business process modeling
 Business reference model
 Business rule
 Business schools
 Business trip
 Capitalism
 Change management analyst
 Commercial law
 Company
 Competition
 Competitive advantage
 Cooperative
 Core competency
 Corporate law
 Corporation
 Cost overrun
 Debenture
 Ebusiness
 Economic democracy
 Economics
 Electronic business
 Electronic commerce
 Entrepreneurship
 Equity investment
 Financial economics
 Franchising
 Government ownership
 Growth platforms
 Human Resources
 Index of accounting articles
 Industry
 Insurance
 Intellectual property
 Interim Management
 International trade
 Investment
 Investment management
 Job creation program
 Labour economics
 Limited liability
 List of billionaires
 List of business films
 List of business theorists
 List of economists
 List of human resource management topics
 List of international trade topics
 List of oldest companies
 List of production topics
 List of real estate topics
 List of Theory of Constraints topics
 Management
 Management information systems
 Management philosophy
 Manufacturing
 Market forms
 Marketing plan
 Mass media
 Middle management
 Money
 Organizational studies
 Outline of business management
 Outline of commercial law
 Outline of economics
 Outline of finance
 Outline of marketing
 Outline of production
 Outline of project management
 Partnership
 Process management
 Profit (disambiguation)
 Project management
 Real Estate
 Renewable Energy
 Revenue shortfall
 Senior management
 Small business
 Social responsibility
 Social security
 Strategic management
 Strategic planning
 Strategy dynamics
 Tax
 The Design of Business
 Theory of Constraints
 Trade name
 Value migration

Business scholars
 Peter Drucker
 Tom Peters

Leaders in business

 Al-Waleed bin Talal
 Warren Buffett
 Elon Musk
 Andrew Carnegie
 Walt Disney
 Thomas Edison
 Michael Eisner
 Henry Ford
 Bill Gates
 J. Paul Getty
 Howard Hughes
 Steve Jobs
 Ray Kroc
 Li Ka-shing
 Lakshmi Mittal
 J. P. Morgan
 Rupert Murdoch
 Aristotle Onassis
 Amancio Ortega
 John D. Rockefeller
 J. R. Simplot
 Carlos Slim
 Ratan Tata
 Ted Turner
 Sam Walton
 Thomas J. Watson

References

Business
Business